Indian Institute of Science Education and Research Kolkata (IISER-K or IISER Kolkata) is an autonomous institute in science and education field located in Mohanpur near the town of Kalyani in Nadia, West Bengal, India. It was established by the Ministry of Human Resource Development in 2006 and promoted to the status of an Institute of National Importance in 2012 vide the NIT Amendment Act. It is one of seven Indian Institutes of Science Education and Research, and was the first of the IISERs to be established along with IISER Pune. It is considered to be one of the leading institutes of India in terms of research output, and was ranked fourth among the academic institutions in India by the Nature Index (compiled by Nature Research). AIIMS Kalyani, IIIT Kalyani, Bidhan Chandra Krishi Viswavidyalaya (BCKV) & MAKAUT are other nearby Institutions.

Admissions

Admission is done through the three channels open for all IISERs:
Kishore Vaigyanik Protsahan Yojana (KVPY)
Joint Entrance Examination – Advanced (JEE-Advanced)
State and Central Boards (SCBs)
From 2019 onwards it was declared on behalf of all IISERs that a maximum of 25% of the seats are assigned to KVPY and JEE-Advanced students. Students applying through SCBs also need to take IISER Aptitude Test (IAT), and are assigned by merit on this test. Note, only the students who are in top 20 percentile of their Class 12th Board exam of their respective board are eligible to appear for IISER Aptitude Test (IAT).

Organisation 
The institute has five major departments: biological sciences; chemical sciences; earth sciences; mathematics and statistics; and physical sciences. Additionally, the institute hosts the multi-institutional Center of Excellence in Space Sciences India (CESSI) with participating scientists from ISRO and other astronomy institutes and is involved in research associated with national space science missions. Other centres include the Centre for Advanced Functional Materials, National Centre for High Pressure Studies and a Centre for Climate and Environment Studies. The college also provides minor qualifications through the humanities and social sciences (HSS) department and the computational and data sciences (CDS) department.
It also has a field station for ecological, environmental and field studies, a greenhouse, a broadband seismological observatory. The institute jointly runs the Göttingen-Kolkata: Open shell systems (G-KOSS) in fundamentals of molecular spintronics with Georg-August-Universität Göttingen. The institute also hosts the Dirac Supercomputer, which was inaugurated in April 2019. The performance of this supercomputing facility is 78.8 Teraflops.

Events
The college organizes a major annual festival, Inquivesta, which is promoted as one of the first and the biggest science festivals of the country.

Inquivesta sees a footfall of 1000+, and has been visited by artists such as Zakir Khan (comedian), Sapan Verma, Nalayak (band) and Anubhav Singh Bassi. It has also received brands such as Baskin-Robbins and Domino's Pizza as its previous partners 
IISER Kolkata has also been hosting VIJYOSHI (the national science camp), along with IISc Bangalore and the Department of Science and Technology, Govt. of India, since 2014.

The institute also has an E-Cell  for promoting an entrepreneurial culture in the student body.

Rankings 

Internationally, the institute was ranked 251–300 among institutes in emerging economies, by the Times Higher Education "Emerging Economies University Rankings 2022".

In India, the National Institutional Ranking Framework (NIRF) ranked the institute 40 overall in 2022, and 32 among research institutes.

See also
 List of universities in India
 List of autonomous higher education institutes in India
 List of Institutes of National Importance

References

External links
 
 

Universities and colleges in Kolkata
Research institutes in Kolkata
Kolkata, Indian Institutes of Science Education and Research
Biological research institutes
Chemical research institutes
Physics institutes
Scientific organizations
Research institutes established in 2006
Materials science institutes
2006 establishments in West Bengal
Education research institutes
Educational institutions established in 2006
Kalyani, West Bengal